Julio Rafael Pineda (born December 20, 1937) is a retired Cuban-American television news reporter who spent four decades as anchor for the Spanish language station WXTV, the Univision affiliate in New York City.

Born in Baracoa, Cuba, he immigrated to the United States before his 20th birthday. He began his career at the Spanish-language station WXTV in 1968.

Pineda was the lead news anchor on WXTV until 1988, when he became host of the first Spanish-language local interview program in the tri-state area, Punto y Aparte until it ended a year later, in 1989. He led WXTV to first place among New York's Spanish language newscasts and was the first Spanish-speaking news anchor to interview both political figures and celebrities, such as Bill Clinton and Desi Arnaz.

Awards and recognition
On June 5, 2005, Pineda was honored by Union City, New Jersey with a star on the Walk of Fame at Union City's Celia Cruz Park.

Retirement
On October 24, 2013, Pineda announced during the 6 P.M. newscast his plans to retire on Friday, December 20, 2013. He served 41 years total at WXTV, longer than any New York City anchor before Chuck Scarborough reached 42 years with WNBC in 2016.

References

1937 births
Living people
Cuban emigrants to the United States
American television journalists
Television anchors from New York City
American male journalists
People from Baracoa
OTI Festival presenters